Dread Locks Dread is an album by the Jamaican deejay Big Youth, released in 1975.

Critical reception
Trouser Press wrote that "the record is widely considered his best."

Track listing
All tracks by Big Youth & Tony Robinson
 "Train to Rhodesia" – 3:33 
 "House of Dread Locks" – 3:17
 "Lightning Flash (Weak Heart Drop)" – 3:21
 "Natty Dread She Want" – 3:18
 "Some Like It Dread" – 3:05
 "Marcus Garvey Dread" – 3:03
 "Big Youth Special" – 2:29
 "Dread Organ" – 3:02
 "Black Man Message" – 2:53
 "Moving On" – 3:07
 "You Don't Care" – 2:36

Personnel
Skin, Flesh & Bones – backing band
Big Youth – vocals
Casey Cashman – art direction
Trevor Herman – liner notes
Cooke Key – sleeve art
Dennis Morris – photography
Dave Turner – mastering

Recording information
 Recording : Randy's, Kingston, Jamaica & Harry J, Kingston, Jamaica
 Mixing : Joe Gibbs 
 Engineer : Errol Thompson
 Arranger : Tony Robinson

References

1975 albums
Big Youth albums